Frederik Arnold ("Fred") Patrick (25 July 1965 – 7 June 1989) was a Dutch footballer. During his career he served AZ Alkmaar and PEC Zwolle. Patrick was born in Paramaribo, where he died at the age of 23, when on 7 June 1989 he was killed in the Surinam Airways Flight PY764 air crash. He was nicknamed "Stevie" for his well-known imitations of Stevie Wonder.

Patrick made his professional debut at AZ Alkmaar where he was part of the magic Surinamese trio existing of Patrick, Paul Nortan and Sigi Lens. In 1987, he decided to make a switch and signed for PEC Zwolle. This turned out to be no successful move as they were battling against relegation the whole season long. Eventually, on the last matchday in a match against FC Den Bosch they were officially relegated from the Eredivisie to the Eerste Divisie.

He was invited by Sonny Hasnoe, the founder of the Colourful 11 to be part of the team and travel to Suriname to play in the "Boxel Kleurrijk Tournament" with three Surinamese teams. The Surinam Airways Flight PY764 crashed during approach to Paramaribo-Zanderij International Airport, killing 176 of the 187 on board, including Patrick, making it the worst ever aviation disaster in Suriname's history. Among the victims were a total of 15 members of the Colourful 11, only three of them survived.

The east stand of the new IJsseldelta Stadion was named after Fred Patrick in 2007. The other stands were named after Henk Timmer, Klaas Drost and Marten Eibrink.

References
 Patrick at AndroKnel.nl 
 Fred Patrick stand 
 Crash report
 Iwan Tol: Eindbesteming Zanderij; het vergeten verhaal van het Kleurrijk Elftal 

1965 births
1989 deaths
Sportspeople from Paramaribo
Dutch footballers
Surinamese emigrants to the Netherlands
Eredivisie players
AZ Alkmaar players
PEC Zwolle players
Association football midfielders
Footballers killed in the Surinam Airways Flight 764 crash